Sodium dodecyl sulfate (SDS) or sodium lauryl sulfate (SLS), sometimes written sodium laurilsulfate, is an organic compound with the formula  and structure . It is an anionic surfactant used in many cleaning and hygiene products. This compound is the sodium salt of the 12-carbon organosulfate. Its hydrocarbon tail combined with a polar "headgroup" give the compound amphiphilic properties that make it useful as a detergent.  SDS is also component of mixtures produced from inexpensive coconut and palm oils. SDS is a common component of many domestic cleaning, personal hygiene and cosmetic, pharmaceutical, and food products, as well as of industrial and commercial cleaning and product formulations.

Physicochemical properties

The critical micelle concentration (CMC) in water at 25 °C is 8.2 mM, and the aggregation number at this concentration is usually considered to be about 62. The micelle ionization fraction (α) is around 0.3 (or 30%).

Applications

Cleaning and hygiene
SDS is mainly used in detergents for laundry with many cleaning applications. It is a highly effective surfactant and is used in any task requiring the removal of oily stains and residues. For example, it is found in higher concentrations with industrial products including engine degreasers, floor cleaners, and car exterior cleaners.

It is a component in hand soap, toothpastes, shampoos, shaving creams, and bubble bath formulations, for its ability to create a foam (lather), for its surfactant properties, and in part for its thickening effect.

Food additive
Sodium dodecyl sulfate, appearing as its synonym sodium lauryl sulfate (SLS), is considered a generally recognized as safe (GRAS) ingredient for food use according to the USFDA (21 CFR 172.822). It is used as an emulsifying agent and whipping aid. As an emulsifier in or with egg whites the United States Code of Federal Regulations require that it must not exceed 1,000 parts per million (0.1%) in egg white solids or 125 parts per million (0.0125%) in frozen or liquid egg whites and as a whipping agent for the preparation of marshmallows it must not exceed 0.5% of the weight of gelatine. SLS is reported to temporarily diminish perception of sweetness.

Laboratory applications
SDS is used in cleaning procedures, and is commonly used as a component for lysing cells during RNA extraction and/or DNA extraction, and for denaturing proteins in preparation for electrophoresis in the SDS-PAGE technique.

In the case of SDS-PAGE, the compound works by disrupting non-covalent bonds in the proteins, and so denaturing them, i.e. causing the protein molecules to lose their native conformations and shapes. By binding to proteins at a ratio of one SDS molecule per 2 amino acid residues, the negatively charged detergent provides all proteins with a similar net negative charge and therefore a similar charge-to-mass ratio. In this way, the difference in mobility of the polypeptide chains in the gel can be attributed solely to their length as opposed to both their native charge and shape. This separation based on the size of the polypeptide chain simplifies the analysis of protein molecules.

Pharmaceutical applications
Sodium lauryl sulfate is a widely used in the pharmaceutical field as an ionic solubilizer and emulsifier that is suitable for applications in liquid dispersions, solutions, emulsions and micro emulsions, tablets, foams and semi-solids such as creams, lotions and gels. Additionally, SLS aids in tablet wettability, as well as lubrication during manufacturing. Brand names of pharma-grade SLS include Kolliphor SLS and Kolliphor SLS Fine.

Miscellaneous applications
SLS is used in an improved technique for preparing brain tissues for study by optical microscopy. The technique, which has been branded as CLARITY, was the work of Karl Deisseroth and coworkers at Stanford University, and involves infusion of the organ with an acrylamide solution to bind the macromolecules of the organ (proteins, nucleic acids, etc.), followed by thermal polymerization to form a "brain–hydrogel" (a mesh interspersed throughout the tissue to fix the macromolecules and other structures in space), and then by lipid removal using SDS to eliminate light scattering with minimal protein loss, rendering the tissue quasi-transparent.

Along with sodium dodecylbenzene sulfonate and Triton X-100, aqueous solutions of SDS are popular for dispersing or suspending nanotubes, such as carbon nanotubes.

Other uses
SLS has been proposed as a potentially effective topical microbicide, for intravaginal use, to inhibit and possibly prevent infection by various enveloped and non-enveloped viruses such as the herpes simplex viruses, HIV, and the Semliki Forest virus.

Liquid membranes formed from SDS in water have been demonstrated to work as unusual particle separators.  The device acts as a reverse filter, allowing large particles to pass while capturing smaller particles.

Production 
SDS is synthesized by treating lauryl alcohol with sulfur trioxide, oleum, or chlorosulfuric acid to produce hydrogen lauryl sulfate. Lauryl alcohol can be used in pure form or as a mixtures of fatty alcohols. When produced from these sources, "SDS" products are a mixture of various sodium alkyl sulfates with SDS being the main component.  For instance, SDS is a component, along with other chain-length amphiphiles, when produced from coconut oil, and is known as sodium coco sulfate (SCS). SDS is available commercially in powder, pellet, and other forms (each differing in rates of dissolution), as well as in aqueous solutions of varying concentrations.

Safety 
SDS is not carcinogenic in low concentrations according to some studies. Like all detergents, sodium lauryl sulfate removes oils from the skin, and can cause skin and eye irritation. It has been shown to irritate the skin of the face, with prolonged and constant exposure (more than an hour) in young adults. SDS may worsen skin problems in individuals with chronic skin hypersensitivity, with some people being affected more than others.

Oral concerns 

SDS is a common ingredient in toothpastes due to its low cost, its lack of impact on taste, and its desirable action as a foaming agent.

VSCs 

SDS may reduce the amount of bad breath-causing volatile sulfur compounds (VSCs) in the mouth. A series of small crossover studies (25–34 patients) have supported the efficacy of SLS in the reduction of VSCs, and its related positive impact on breath malodor, although these studies have been generally noted to reflect technical challenges in the control of study design variables.

Dry mouth 

Primary sources from the group of Irma Rantanen at University of Turku, Finland claim that SLS-containing pastes cause more dry mouth (xerostomia) than their proposed alternative. However, a 2011 Cochrane review of these studies, and of the more general area, concludes that there "is no strong evidence… that any topical therapy is effective for relieving the symptom of dry mouth."

Mouth ulceration 

A safety concern has been raised on the basis of several studies regarding the effect of toothpaste SDS on aphthous ulcers (more specifically, mouth ulcers or "canker sores"), commonly referred to as canker or white sores. According to the NHS, SLS is a cause for concern for mouth ulcers. As Lippert notes, of 2013, "very few… marketed toothpastes contain a surfactant other than SLS [SDS]," and leading manufacturers continue to formulate their produce with SDS.

See also 
 Sodium tetradecyl sulfate, another anionic surfactant in common use
 Mouth ulcer

References

External links
 Josh Clark, "Why does orange juice taste bad after you brush your teeth?"
  published on Aug 24, 2018 Science (journal)

Organic sodium salts
Cleaning product components
Anionic surfactants
Laxatives
Excipients
Reagents for biochemistry
Sulfate esters